The 1996–97 Danish Cup was the 43rd installment of the Danish Cup, the highest football competition in Denmark.

Final

References

1996-97
1996–97 domestic association football cups
Cup